Abdulkadir Selvi (born 1964) is a Turkish columnist and journalist, currently working at Hürriyet. He joined Yeni Şafak newspaper in 2001 and worked there for 15 years.

Biography 
Abdulkadir Selvi was born in Sivas, Turkey, in 1964. He graduated from Gazi University. During his youth, he worked as an editor at various newspapers and magazines.

He started his career at Yeni Nesil and Yeni Asya newspapers. Then, he worked as a reporter and anews director at HBB TV, a Turkish Television Channel based in Istanbul. In 2001, he joined Yeni Şafak newspaper and he became newspaper's  Ankara Representative. In April 2016 he transferred to Hürriyet newspaper. Abdulkadir Selvi is married and has three children.

Books authored 
Abdulkadir Selvi has three books:
 İşkence Koğuşlarından Siyaset Meydanlarına: Alperen (with Erhan Seven)
 İçimizdeki Gladio ile yüzleşmek
 Ateşten Yıllar: Siyasette Said Nursi Tartışması

References 

1964 births
Living people
Turkish columnists
People from Sivas
Gazi University alumni